Forensic Factor is a Canadian true crime docuseries, which airs on Discovery Channel Canada, Sun TV, and the Justice Network. The series, which utilizes an anthology format, features forensic techniques and their application in crime-solving by examining notable cases.

Episodes

Season 1 (2003)

Season 2 (2004)

Season 3 (2005)

Season 4 (2007)

Season 5 (2008–09)

Season 6 (2010)

References 

2000s Canadian documentary television series
Discovery Channel (Canada) original programming
2003 Canadian television series debuts
2010 Canadian television series endings